KCRA-TV (channel 3) is a television station in Sacramento, California, United States, affiliated with NBC. It is owned by Hearst Television alongside Stockton-licensed MyNetworkTV affiliate KQCA (channel 58). Both stations share studios on Television Circle off D Street in downtown Sacramento, while KCRA-TV's transmitter is located in Walnut Grove, California.

History
The station first signed on the air on September 3, 1955. It was founded by the Central Valley Broadcasting Company, a partnership of the Kelly and Hansen families of Sacramento. Central Valley Broadcasting also owned KCRA radio (1320 AM, now KIFM, and 96.1 FM, now KYMX); the AM station's call letters were intended to be "KRCA", but the middle two letters were erroneously transposed by a typist at the Federal Communications Commission (FCC) when that station's original license was drafted in 1945 and was never corrected. By the time KCRA-TV went on the air, the KRCA call letters had already been taken the previous year by NBC's owned-and-operated station in Los Angeles (originally KNBH, now KNBC). The station's longtime original studios were located at 310 10th Street in Sacramento. KCRA-TV inherited the NBC affiliation from KCCC-TV (channel 40, channel now occupied by Fox affiliate KTXL), which became the Sacramento market's first television station when it signed on in September 1953, which had also carried affiliations with ABC, CBS and DuMont until other stations debuted in the market. However, it in turn also received the affiliation as a result of KCRA radio's decade-long affiliation with the NBC Radio Network.  KCRA was the third of Sacramento's VHF stations to sign on exactly within a year behind KXTV and KOVR—all signing on in six-month increments.

In 1959, under the direction of then chief engineer, William Herbert Hartman, construction began on a new  transmission tower near Walnut Grove to transmit the signals of KCRA-TV, KXTV and KOVR; the tower was completed in 1961. Upon the death of KCRA co-founder Ewing C. Kelly in 1960, son Bob Kelly (who was KCRA's station manager, commercial manager and film buyer) became president of KCRA, Inc., while son Jon Kelly (who served as its local sales manager) was named general manager.

In January 1962, KCRA-TV began transmitting its signal from the Walnut Grove tower, which became the tallest structure in the state. In April of that year, the FCC approved the sale of the Hansen brothers' 50% share of the KCRA stations to Bob, Jon and their mother Nina Kelly; the company then changed its name to Kelly Broadcasting Company. In September 1968, KCRA-FM's call letters were changed to KCTC. The radio stations were sold to the Tribune Company in September 1977, with the sale being finalized in July 1978; KCRA (AM) changed its calls to KGNR in August of that year.

In 1965, the station began using color film for use in its newscasts. A station press release at that time claimed that KCRA was the first station in Sacramento with videotape, the first NBC affiliate with "network color" programming, and the first station to utilize color film, slide and videotape footage. Starting in 1975, it began using remote cameras for live news reports. In 1979, the station began using helicopters and eventually, satellite remotes for newsgathering. On September 10, 1966, Bob Wilkins began hosting a Saturday night horror movie showcase called Seven Arts Theatre; Wilkins later moved his show to KTXL, and then to KTVU in Oakland in the 1970s.

In the mid-1990s, KCRA was carried nationally on the PrimeStar digital satellite television service as an out-of-market distant local network for customers who lived in a market where a local NBC affiliate was absent or otherwise unavailable with an antenna. KCRA's national carriage on PrimeStar ended when the satellite service was acquired by DirecTV in September 1999; DirecTV customers were offered Los Angeles NBC station KNBC instead.

Like other local stations, KCRA developed an in-house production facility, with local children's programming, newsmagazines and talk shows. By the beginning of the 21st century, KCRA became the first station in the Sacramento market to broadcast programming in high definition. Kelly Broadcasting continued to own and operate KCRA-TV until January 1999, when it was purchased by Hearst-Argyle Television (which was renamed Hearst Television in 2009).

In early 2004, KCRA opened an exhibit, "The KCRA 3 Experience", at the Arden Fair Mall, allowing visitors to see a KCRA newscast be produced live. KCRA's noon newscast was broadcast from the complex until late 2008 when production of the program was moved back to the 3 Television Circle studios.

KCRA, along with Fox affiliate KTXL, are the only Sacramento television stations to have never changed their network affiliations, as they were unaffected by affiliation swaps in 1995 (when KXTV acquired the ABC affiliation from KOVR, which in turn, switched to CBS) and 1998 (when KMAX-TV—channel 31—took UPN from now-sister station KQCA, which switched from UPN to The WB).

KCRA 3.2
In early 2005, KCRA debuted a localized version of NBC Weather Plus on digital subchannel 3.2. After NBC Weather Plus shut down in December 2008 (following NBCUniversal's purchase of The Weather Channel), the subchannel continued to use the Weather Plus branding as part of the successor NBC Plus automated weather service until late 2008.

On August 2, 2010, digital subchannel 3.2 was reformatted as "MoreTV Sacramento," a locally programmed channel that featured second-runs of syndicated programs seen locally on KCRA and sister station KQCA; the "MoreTV" branding had previously been used by Tampa sister station WMOR-TV and KCWE in Kansas City during the early and mid-2000s. The channel ran a mix of sitcoms (such as Roseanne, The Cosby Show and That '70s Show), dramas (Law & Order: SVU) and talk shows (Maury, Jerry Springer and The Dr. Oz Show). It also aired select KCRA newscasts, including rebroadcasts KCRA's 6 p.m. newscast at 7 p.m. and KCRA's 10 p.m. and KQCA's 11 p.m. newscasts at midnight; as well as a simulcast of KCRA's noon newscast. Until October 15, 2010, KCRA continued to run Weather Plus programming during the early morning hours (Salinas sister station KSBW also carried a prime time syndicated programming lineup, branded as "KSBW PrimePLUS+", on its second digital subchannel from around the same time as the "MoreTV" launch until February 1, 2011).

On July 24, 2012, Hearst Television renewed its affiliation agreement with MeTV to maintain existing affiliations with eight Hearst-owned stations currently carrying the digital multicast network through 2015. As part of the renewal, Hearst also signed agreements to add the network as digital subchannels of KCRA and sister stations WCVB-TV in Boston, WBAL-TV in Baltimore, KOCO-TV in Oklahoma City and WXII-TV in Greensboro. Digital subchannel 3.2 assumed the MeTV affiliation on September 3, 2012, replacing the "MoreTV" format.

Programming
Over the years, KCRA has preempted some NBC programming, notably the soap opera Another World. That show would air on the station for a brief time, but was preempted again due to low ratings—this was the case with CBS station KOVR (channel 13), which did not run Guiding Light due to poor ratings; the latter program had not aired at all in the market since KXTV (channel 10) dropped it in the early 1990s when it was a CBS affiliate. Eventually, Another World would air instead on future sister station KQCA (at the time, under a local marketing agreement) until the show's cancellation in 1999. Given its format as a news-intensive station, KCRA also preempted the weekend edition of Today and the Saturday morning T-NBC lineup during the 1990s, to run a weekend morning newscast. It also aired a 4:30 p.m. newscast, pushing Days of Our Lives start time back a half-hour earlier than the typical practice; that newscast ended after the station began airing The Oprah Winfrey Show; in September 2002; since then, Days aired at the network-recommended 1 p.m. timeslot on weekdays until the show's move to streaming service Peacock in September 2022. However, despite NBC's historically low tolerance towards program preemptions, the network has been more than satisfied with KCRA, given its near-total ratings dominance in the Sacramento market.

Currently, KCRA airs Today 3rd Hour on a one-hour delay due to Live with Kelly and Ryan airing in the 9 a.m. timeslot (until 1999, the show aired on KOVR, even back in its days as an ABC station); the fourth hour used to air after a repeat of the 11 p.m. newscast at 2:12 a.m. (when NBC rebroadcast the fourth hour nationally as part of its overnight schedule); sister stations KSBW-TV in Salinas, California, WXII-TV in Greensboro, WBAL-TV in Baltimore and WYFF in Greenville, South Carolina also opted to delay the fourth hour of Today until the overnight hours, but on March 28, 2022, the rebroadcast of the fourth hour was replaced by a rebroadcast of NBC News Now's Top Story with Tom Llamas, effectively preempting the program altogether and becoming the only current NBC program to not air on KCRA. Other syndicated programming seen on KCRA includes Access Hollywood and its live counterpart, The Kelly Clarkson Show, and Extra. The first three are distributed by NBC's corporate cousin.

Occasionally as time permits, sister station KQCA may air NBC network programs whenever KCRA is unable to in the event of extended breaking news coverage or scheduled special programming or run KCRA newscasts in their scheduled airtimes due to overruns or scheduled preemptions resulting from network sports coverage airing on channel 3.

KCRA carried select Sacramento Kings games through the network's broadcast contract with the NBA from 1990 to 2002.

News operation
KCRA presently broadcasts 45 hours of locally produced newscasts each week (with 7½ hours each weekday, four hours on Saturdays and 3½ hours on Sundays). KCRA also produces 22 hours a week of local newscasts for sister station KQCA with a three-hour extension of KCRA's weekday morning newscast from 7–10 a.m. and a nightly full-hour prime time broadcast at 10 p.m. The station's longtime slogan, "Where The News Comes First", has become a symbol for its news coverage. The slogan was first used by KCRA in December 1958 (Kelly filed to trademark the slogan in 1980) and has been licensed to other television stations.

From 1991 to 1993, KCRA (later to be joined by KRON-TV and KPIX in San Francisco) participated in an experiment in which prime time programming would air one hour earlier (from 7 to 10 p.m., mirroring typical network scheduling in the Central, Mountain and Hawaii Time Zones, instead of the standard 8 to 11 p.m. slot for Pacific Time Zone stations). The "early prime" idea led to only a slight decrease in KCRA's ratings, and its 10 p.m. newscast remained the highest-rated late local news program on the West Coast. A station survey showed that 63% of viewers thought a 10 p.m. newscast was a good idea. However, pressure from NBC, who threatened to yank the station's affiliation, forced KCRA to end the practice and revert to the time zone's standard prime time scheduling, announcing its demise a week after KRON-TV discontinued the experiment; however, it also resulted in KCRA beginning a 10 p.m. newscast on channel 58, which was then KSCH. KOVR would itself switch to an early prime time schedule two years later after switching to CBS.

Under Hearst ownership, KCRA has either hosted or co-hosted many gubernatorial debates within California, often with political reporter Kevin Riggs serving as moderator and one other personality hosting the debate. Many of these debates are simulcast on sister station KSBW in Salinas. A notable example of such is the debate between Meg Whitman and Jerry Brown.

From about 1960 until the late 1980s, its logo was an Arabic numeral 3 inside a green square with rounded corners and convex sides (to represent the shape of a TV tube).  The current logo, a partially modified version of the original design, was adopted in the late 1980s. Also, it referred to its newscasts as Channel 3 Reports rather than Channel 3 News. The branding was slightly modified after the Hearst purchase to KCRA 3 Reports, even as its newscasts on KQCA began to be titled as KCRA 3 News. However, in August 2009, KCRA retitled its 11 p.m. newscast as the KCRA 3 Night Team. In July 2011, the Reports branding was phased out from the station's news branding, which changed to KCRA 3 News.

In late December 2005, KCRA began using a new "Triple Doppler" system for weather reports. In addition to KCRA's own Doppler weather radar system at Walnut Grove, range and accuracy were increased by adding data from NEXRAD sites operated by the National Weather Service located north of Reno on Virginia Peak, south of San Jose on Mount Umunhum, and at Beale Air Force Base.

On February 12, 2007, KCRA became the first television station in the Sacramento market and the first among Hearst-Argyle's station portfolio to begin broadcasting its local newscasts in high definition (with the exception of its noon newscast until 2008 as it was still broadcasting in standard-definition at Arden Fair Mall); this came with the introduction of a new news set designed by FX Group and upgrades to its news helicopter, LiveCopter 3. Upon the conversion to HD, the KCRA logo was modified to include the NBC peacock logo and an "HD" lettering. Only in-studio cameras record in HD, while the helicopter's camera, field cameras and other station camera feeds are in standard definition and are upconverted to a 16:9 widescreen format in the control room. In September 2008, KCRA began using a new "Triple Doppler" system with high-definition graphics. As of August 25, 2010, with KSBW upgrading its newscasts to HD, both KCRA and KSBW now share resources in this format when covering news stories from their respective markets.

On December 21, 2015, KCRA announced the addition of a new 4 p.m. newscast, anchored by Lisa Gonzales and Brian Heap. The newscast premiered on January 25, 2016. A Spanish-subtitled simulcast of KCRA's 5 p.m. newscast was added to sister station KQCA's Estrella TV subchannel on September 5, 2017. This newscast was not in direct competition with any Spanish-language newscast in the market until March 18, 2020 when Telemundo owned-and-operated station KCSO-LD launched newscasts at 5 p.m. and 5:30 p.m. On April 23, 2018, KCRA began its expanded weekday morning newscast with an extra half-hour starting at 4 a.m.

In March 2020, amidst the COVID-19 pandemic, the station added an additional hour of news and launched a new 7 p.m. newscast that airs on weekdays. The newscast remains on-air today as a half-hour newscast.

Notable former on-air staff

 Miguel Almaguer – reporter (2003–2006; now Los Angeles-based correspondent for NBC News)
 Stan Atkinson – anchor (1959–1963, 1976–1994; later moved to KOVR in Sacramento, now retired)
 Maurice DuBois – anchor/reporter (now at WCBS-TV in New York City)
 Jim Finnerty – host of local talk show Finnerty and Company (later renamed Look Who's Talking)
 Gary Gerould – sports anchor (now radio play-by-play for the Sacramento Kings)
 John Gibson – Bay Area correspondent (now at Fox News Channel)
 David Gregory (moderator of Meet the Press from 2008–2014)
 Kristine Hanson – sports anchor/weather anchor/entertainment reporter (1980s; former Playboy Playmate)
 Lois Hart – 5 and 6:30 p.m. anchor (1990–2008; retired)
 Bob Hogue – sports director (early 1980s, former Hawaiian State Senator)
 Joe Lizura – meteorologist (1987–1989, moved to WLWT in Cincinnati, then KNSD and KUSI-TV in San Diego, now CEO at Allowance Media Group)
 Joan Lunden (1970s as first television job; she later changed her surname to Lunden, moved to ABC's Good Morning America)
 Rob Mayeda – meteorologist/anchor/reporter (1999–2000; now at KNTV in San Jose–San Francisco)
 Byron Miranda – Meteorologist (now with WPIX in New York)
 Leyna Nguyen – anchor/reporter (now at KCAL in Los Angeles)
 Jeff Ranieri – meteorologist (2000–2005; later at MSNBC/NBC Weather Plus, now chief meteorologist at KNTV in San Jose/San Francisco)
 Bianca Solorzano – weekend morning anchor/reporter (1999–2003; now a CBS News correspondent in New York City)
 Kaity Tong – anchor/reporter (1979–1981; now at WPIX in New York City)
 David Walker – 5 and 6:30 p.m. anchor (1990–2008; retired)
 Pamela Wu – weekend anchor/reporter (2001–2009; now director of marketing and communications at the University of California, Davis School of Law (King Hall)

Notable incidents
For years, residents in North Lake Tahoe and South Lake Tahoe received KCRA via cable, even though the latter community fell outside the Sacramento media market as defined by Nielsen. In 2018, Charter Communications stopped distributing KCRA to residents in South Lake Tahoe, opting to distribute Reno NBC affiliate KRNV on an exclusive basis. Charter said its decision was based on an FCC rule that required it to only carry programming from a network affiliate in a designated media market. The move angered residents of South Lake Tahoe, with many saying Charter's decision to drop KCRA left cable customers without access to local news and election information. Officials in El Dorado County petitioned the FCC to annex South Lake Tahoe from the Reno market into the Sacramento market.

On January 4, 2020, a fire broke out at KCRA's main building on Television Circle in Sacramento. The fire was contained to an older portion of the building that had been used as storage, but was otherwise mostly abandoned. Despite forcing the evacuation of some staff, the station remained on-air, broadcasting the West Coast feed of Saturday Night Live while firefighters worked to extinguish the blaze.

During the COVID-19 pandemic in 2020, KCRA, like many local stations, modified its news practices to allow reporters to file news packages from remote locations, including their homes. On April 17, 2020, San Joaquin County Bureau Chief Melinda Meza filed a news story on the difficulties hair stylists were facing during a state-mandated quarantine order. At the end of her report, a nude man was visible in the background as Meza filmed herself in her bathroom. The uncensored segment aired during the station's 6:30 p.m. newscast, generating a significant amount of social media attention. A few hours later, Meza deleted an Instagram post and a tweet promoting the story. No one from the station or its parent company Hearst had commented on the incident. On July 31, 2020, Meza was fired from the station.

In December 2020, KCRA and several other news organizations were sued in federal court for copyright infringement stemming from the re-use of a Canadian photographer's wildlife images without authorization or payment.

Technical information

Subchannels
The station's digital signal is multiplexed:

Analog-to-digital conversion
KCRA-TV shut down its analog signal, over VHF channel 3, on June 12, 2009, as part of the federally mandated transition from analog to digital television. The station's digital signal remained on its pre-transition UHF channel 35, using PSIP to display KCRA-TV's virtual channel as 3 on digital television receivers.

As part of the SAFER Act, KCRA ran a looping DTV program (also known as "nightlight service") for 30 days after the transition. The looping program aired public service announcements in English and Spanish about the digital transition.

References

External links
 

NBC network affiliates
MeTV affiliates
Story Television affiliates
Television channels and stations established in 1955
CRA-TV
Hearst Television
1955 establishments in California